The Landig Group was an occultist and neo-völkisch group formed in 1950, that first gathered for discussions at the studio of the designer Wilhelm Landig in the Margareten district of Vienna. The circle's most prominent and influential members were Wilhelm Landig (1909–1997), Erich Halik (Claude Schweighardt) and Rudolf J. Mund (1920–1985). The circle has also been referred to as the Landig Circle (Landig Kreis), Vienna Group (Wien Konzern)  and Vienna Lodge (Wien Lodge).

Background
Landig was the founder of the group, which has since inspired decades of völkisch mysticism. He and his group revived the ariosophical, Ario-Germanic mythology of Thule, the supposed polar homeland of the ancient Aryans.

Landig "coined the term Black Sun, a substitute Swastika [and/or Fylfot] and mystical source of energy capable of regenerating the Aryan race."
Landig, through his circle, popularized esoteric ideas current among the pre-Nazi völkisch movement and the SS relating to Atlantis, the World Ice Theory, pre-historic floods and secret racial doctrines from Tibet.

Landig and other occult-fascist propagandists have circulated wild stories about German Nazi colonies that live and work in secret installations beneath the polar ice caps, where they developed flying saucers and miracle weapons such as Die Glocke after the demise of the Third Reich. Including the theory that flying saucers were Nazi secret weapons launched from an underground base in Antarctica, from which the Nazis hoped to conquer the world.

The focus of the group's discussions was a secret center in the Arctic known as the Blue Island, which could serve as a source point for a renaissance of traditional life. This idea was taken from Julius Evola, whose Revolt Against the Modern World became the bible of the Landig group.

More so, or at least equally as important to the group as Evola's book, the Vienna Group hungrily devoured the ideas and books of Herman Wirth.

Wilhelm Landig
Landig was a former SS member who revived the ariosophical mythology of Thule.  He was born on 20 December 1909. He wrote the Thule trilogy Götzen gegen Thule (1971), Wolfszeit um Thule (1980) and Rebellen für Thule – Das Erbe von Atlantis (1991). He inspired the idea of the Black Sun, a substitute swastika and mythical source of energy, which was launched in the 1991 novel Die Schwarze Sonne von Tashi Lhunpo by ghostwriter Russell McCloud.

Continuities
It has been shown that a younger generation continued the development of the circle's ideas from the 1980s on. This younger generation consisted of members of the German/Austrian Tempelhofgesellschaft. Their publications demonstrate an exchange of ideas with the older generation, mainly revolving around the Black Sun concept. After the Tempelhofgesellschaft had been dissolved, it was succeeded by the Causa Nostra, a Freundeskreis (circle of friends) that remains active.

See also
Black Sun (symbol)
Occultism in Nazism
Nicholas Goodrick-Clarke
Hollow Earth
Esoteric Nazism
Nazi archaeology
Vril#Vril Society
Thule Society

References

Culture in Vienna
Germanic mysticism
1950 establishments in Austria